Nueva Segovia Department (Nicaragua)
 Roman Catholic Archdiocese of Nueva Segovia (Philippines)
City
 Nueva Segovia, Nicaragua founded by Spanish colonists in Quilalí, in 1543, now called Ocotal
 Lal-Lo, Cagayan, formerly named Nueva Segovia
 The full name of Barquisimeto, Venezuela, is Nueva Segovia de Barquisimeto